Unió Esportiva Sant Andreu is a Spanish football team based in the city of Barcelona in the district of Sant Andreu, in the autonomous community of Catalonia. Founded in 1909, it plays in Tercera División RFEF – Group 5, holding home matches at Camp Municipal Narcís Sala, with an all-seated capacity of 6,563.

Club background
Club de Futbol Andreuenc (1909–25)
L'Avenç del Sport (1911–25)
Unió Esportiva Sant Andreu (1925–40)
Club Deportivo San Andrés (1940–79)
Unión Deportiva San Andrés (1979–80)
Unió Esportiva Sant Andreu (1980–current)

Season to season

11 seasons in Segunda División
19 seasons in Segunda División B
44 seasons in Tercera División
1 season in Tercera División RFEF

Current squad

Honours
Segunda División B: 1991–92
Tercera División: 1949–50, 1957–58, 1968–69, 1984–85, 1989–90
Copa Catalunya: 2008–09, 2018–19
Copa Federación: 2012–13
Catalan Second Division: 1919–20, 1920–21, 1939–40
Catalan Historical Teams Tournament: 2007

Former players
Note: this list includes players that have appeared in at least 100 league games and/or have reached international status.
 Ramón Calderé
 Manuel Lanzarote
 Luso
 José Miguel Morales
 Ildefons Lima

Former coaches
 Domènec Balmanya
 César Rodríguez
 Jiří Sobotka

References

External links
Official website 
Futbolme team profile 
Flama i Ginesta, magazine web 

 
Football clubs in Catalonia
Football clubs in Barcelona
Association football clubs established in 1909
1909 establishments in Spain
Segunda División clubs